The tropical apricot or ketcot is a hybrid thorny shrub cultivated for its fruit. It arose naturally in Florida, and in 1953 selected plants were propagated.

References